The Women's 100 metre freestyle competition of the 2018 European Aquatics Championships was held on 7 and 8 August 2018.

Records
Prior to the competition, the existing world and championship records were as follows.

Results

Heats
The heats were started on 7 August at 09:00.

Semifinals
The semifinals were started on 7 August at 17:11.

Semifinal 1

Semifinal 2

Final
The final was started on 8 August at 16:43.

References

Women's 100 metre freestyle